Charli XCX is an English singer and songwriter who has received various recognitions including two Grammy Award nominations, a Billboard Music Award, five nominations for the MTV Video Music Awards, four nominations at the MTV Europe Music Awards and a Brit Award nomination.

She rose to prominence in 2012 with the Icona Pop collaboration "I Love It", the song reached top 10 in United States and Europe and was nominated for Top Dance/Electronic Song at the Billboard Music Awards. In 2014 she achieved commercial success with "Fancy", a collaboration with Australian rapper Iggy Azalea, the song received several awards and nominations worldwide including two nominations for the Grammy Awards, Record of the Year and Best Pop Duo/Group Performance, won the Billboard Music Award for Top Rap Song and got four nominations at the 2014 MTV Video Music Awards including Video of the Year and Best Pop Video. The same year she released "Boom Clap", a song for the 2014 romance film The Fault in Our Stars, the track became her first solo top-ten single on the Billboard Hot 100, received a nomination for the MTV Video Music Award for Best New Artist and was one of the ten music videos shortlisted for the Brit Award for British Video of the Year, though it was not one of the five nominees. Her breakthrough during the year resulted in nominations for Best New Art and Best Push Act at the MTV Europe Music Awards.

In 2015, she began working alongside producers from the UK collective PC Music developing a more experimental sound and image and achieving critical success with her subsequent projects. She released several EPs and mixtapes and received two UK Music Video Award nominations for her 2017 single "Boys" alongside multiple wins and nominations at the NME Awards winning Best British Female Artist in 2016 and Best Track for "Boys" in 2018 and receiving nominations for Best Mixtape for Pop 2 and two for Best British Solo Artist in 2017 and 2018.

In 2019, she released Charli, her third album and the next year she released her fourth one How I'm Feeling Now, both received critical acclaim and the latter was shortlisted for the Mercury Music Prize for Album of the Year. In 2020 she was nominated for British Female Solo Artist at the 2020 Brit Awards.

In 2022, she released her most successful album to date, Crash.

Awards and nominations
{| class="wikitable sortable plainrowheaders" style="width:100%" 
|-
! scope="col" | Award
! scope="col" | Year
! scope="col" | Nominee(s)
! scope="col" | Category
! scope="col" | Result
! scope="col" class="unsortable"| 
|-
! scope="row"| AMFT Awards
| 2020
| "Claws"
| Best Dance Recording
| 
| 
|-
! scope="row"|ARIA Music Awards
| 2014
| "Fancy" 
| Song of the Year
| 
| 
|-
! scope="row" | ASCAP Pop Music Awards
| 2020
| "Señorita"
| Award-Winning Song
| 
| 
|-
! scope="row" | Attitude Awards
| 2017
| Herself
| Best Music Act
| 
| 
|-
! scope="row" rowspan=4| Billboard Music Awards
| 2014
| "I Love It" 
| Top Dance/Electronic Song
| 
| 
|-
| rowspan=3| 2015
| rowspan=3|"Fancy" 
| Top Hot 100 Song
| 
| rowspan=3|
|-
| Top Streaming Song (Audio)
| 
|-
| Top Rap Song
| 
|-
! scope="row"| Billboard Women in Music
| 2014
| Herself
| Hitmaker of the Year
| 
| 
|-
! scope="row" rowspan=2| Billboard.com Mid-Year Awards
| rowspan=2|2014
| rowspan=2|"Fancy" 
| Favorite No. 1 Hot 100 Song
| 
| rowspan=2|
|-
| Best Music Video
|
|-
! scope="row" rowspan=3|Brit Awards
| 2015
| "Boom Clap"
| British Video
| 
| rowspan=1|
|-
| 2020
| rowspan=2|Herself
| British Female Solo Artist
| 
| 
|-
| 2023
| British Pop/R&B Act
| 
| 
|-
!scope="row"|British LGBT Awards
| 2021
| Herself
| Celebrity Ally
| 
| 
|-
! scope="row" rowspan=2|Capricho Awards
| rowspan=2|2014
| rowspan=2|"Fancy" 
| Best International Hit
| 
| rowspan=2|
|-
| Best International Video
| 
|-
! scope="row"| City of Hope's 11th Annual Songs of Hope
| 2016
| Herself
| Vanguard Award
| 
| 
|-
! scope="row" rowspan=4| GAFFA Awards (Sweden)
| rowspan=2|2019
| Herself
| Best International Solo Artist
| 
| rowspan="2"| 
|-
| "1999" 
| Best International Hit
| 
|-
| rowspan=2|2021
| Herself
| Best International Solo Artist
| 
| rowspan=2|
|-
| How I'm Feeling Now
| Best International Album
| 
|-
! scope="row" | GQ Awards
| 2019
| Herself 
| Woman Of The Year
| 
| 
|-
! scope="row" | Gay Times Honours 500
| 2019
| Herself
| Allyship in Music
| 
| 
|-
! scope="row" rowspan=2|Grammy Awards
| rowspan="2"| 2015
|rowspan="2"| "Fancy" 
| Record of the Year
| 
| rowspan=2|
|-
| Best Pop Duo/Group Performance
|
|-
! scope="row"|International Dance Music Awards
| 2015
| "Fancy" 
| Best Rap/Hip-Hop/Trap Dance Track
| 
| 
|-
! scope="row" rowspan=5| iHeartRadio Music Awards
|  2014
| "I Love It" 
| Best Lyrics
| 
| 
|-
| rowspan="3"|2015
| Herself
| Renegade
| 
| rowspan=3|
|-
| rowspan="2"|"Fancy" 
| Song of the Year
| 
|-
| Best Collaboration
| 
|-
| 2023
| Dance Song of the Year
| "Hot In It" 
| 
| 
|-
! scope="row" | Kids Choice Awards
| 2015
| "Fancy" 
| Favorite Song
| 
| 
|-
! scope="row" | Mercury Prize
| 2020
| How I'm Feeling Now
| Album of the Year
| 
| 
|-
! scope="row" rowspan=5|MTV Europe Music Awards
| rowspan=2|2014
| rowspan="4"| Herself
|Best New Act
|
| rowspan=2|
|-
|Best Push Act
|
|-
|2015 
|rowspan="2"|Best World Stage Performance
|
|
|-
| 2018
| 
|-
| 2022
| "Samsung Superstar Galaxy Concert Charli XCX - Roblox"
| Best Metaverse Performance
| 
| 
|-
! scope="row"|MTV Italian Music Awards
| 2015
| Herself
| Best New Artist
| 
| 
|-
! scope="row" rowspan=6|MTV Video Music Awards
| rowspan=5|2014
| "Boom Clap"
|Best New Artist
|
| rowspan=5|
|-
|rowspan="4"|"Fancy" 
|Video of the Year
|
|-
|Best Female Video
|
|-
|Best Art Direction
|
|-
|Best Pop Video
|
|-
| 2022
| Charli XCX - Roblox
| Best Metaverse Performance
| 
| style="text-align:center;"|
|-
! scope="row" rowspan=3|mtvU Woodie Awards
| 2012
| rowspan=2|Herself
| Breaking Woodie
| 
| 
|-
| rowspan=2|2015
| Woodie of the Year
| 
| rowspan=2|
|-
| "Shake It Off"
| Cover Woodie
| 
|-
! scope="row" |Much Music Video Awards
| 2014
| "Fancy" 
| International Video of the Year – Artist
| 
| 
|-
! scope="row |Musikförläggarnas Pris
| 2015
| "Boom Clap"
| Best Song
| 
| 
|-
! scope="row" rowspan=13|NME Awards
| 2015
| "Fancy" 
| Dancefloor Filler
| 
| 
|-
| 2016
| rowspan=2|Herself
| Best British Female Artist
| 
| 
|-
| rowspan=2|2017
| Best British Solo Artist
| 
| rowspan=2|
|-
| "After the Afterparty"
| rowspan="2" | Best Track  
|
|-
| rowspan=4|2018
| rowspan="2" | "Boys"
| 
| rowspan=4|
|-
| Best Video 
| 
|-
| Herself
| Best British Solo Artist
| 
|-
| Pop 2
| Best Mixtape
| 
|-
| rowspan=3|2020
| rowspan=2|Herself
|Best British Solo Act 
|
| rowspan=3|
|-
| Best Solo Act in the World
| 
|-
| "Gone" 
| Best Collaboration 
|
|-
| rowspan=2|2022
| rowspan=2|"Good Ones"
| Best Song In The World
| 
| rowspan=2|
|-
| Best Song By A UK Artist
| 
|-
! scope="row" | NewNowNext Awards 
| 2014
| Herself
| Best New Musician
| 
| 
|-
!scope="row"|P3 Guld Music Awards
| 2013
| "I Love It" 
| Best Song
| 
| 
|-
! scope="row"| People's Choice Awards
| 2015
| Herself
| Favorite Breakout Artist
| 
| 
|-
! scope="row" rowspan=5|Popjustice £20 Music Prize
| 2014
| "Boom Clap"
| rowspan=5|Best British Pop Single
| 
| rowspan=4|
|-
| 2017
| "Boys"
| 
|-
| 2019
| "Blame It on Your Love" 
| 
|-
| 2020
| "Forever"
| 
|-
| 2022
| "Good Ones"
| 
| 
|-
! scope="row" rowspan=2|Queerty Awards
| 2014
| "Fancy" 
| Earworm of the Year
| 
| 
|-
| 2020
| "Gone" (with Christine and the Queens)
| Anthem
| 
| 
|-
! scope="row" rowspan=3|Project U'S You've Done Quite Well Awards
| rowspan=3|2017
| Herself
| Music Person of the Year
| 
| rowspan=3 |
|-
| rowspan=2|"Boys"
| International Song of the Year
| 
|-
| Best Music Video
| 
|-
! scope="row" |Radio Disney Music Awards
| 2015
| Herself
| Best New Artist
| 
| 
|-
! scope="row" rowspan=7|Rober Awards Music Prize
| 2011
| Herself
| Most Promising New Artist
| 
| 
|-
| rowspan=3|2017
| "Boys"
| Best Music Video
| 
| rowspan=3|
|-
| Herself
| Best Pop Artist 
| 
|-
| "3AM (Pull Up)" (with MØ)
| rowspan=3|Floorfiller of the Year 
| 
|-
| 2018
| "Out of My Head" (with Tove Lo & Alma)
| 
| 
|-
| 2019
| "Gone" (with Christine and the Queens)
| 
|
|-
| rowspan=1|2020
| Herself
| Best Electronic Artist
| 
| 
|- 
! scope="row" rowspan=4| SESAC Pop Awards
| rowspan=2|2014
| rowspan="2"|"I Love It" 
| Songwriter of the Year
| 
| rowspan=2|
|-
| rowspan=2|Song of the Year
| 
|-
| rowspan=2|2017
| "Same Old Love"
| 
| rowspan=2|
|-
| Herself
| Songwriter of the Year
| 
|-
! scope="row" rowspan=5|Teen Choice Awards
| 2013
| "I Love It" 
| Choice Single: Group
| 
| 
|-
| rowspan=4|2014
| rowspan=1| "Boom Clap"
| Choice Love Song
| 
| rowspan=4|
|-
| rowspan=3|"Fancy" 
| Choice R&B/Hip-Hop Song
| 
|-
| Choice Summer Song
| 
|-
| Choice Single: Female
| 
|-
!scope="row"|The Daily Californian Art Awards
| 2020
| "Ringtone (remix)" (with 100 Gecs)
| Song of the Year
| 
| 
|-
! scope="row" rowspan=4|UK Music Video Awards
| 2014
| "Fancy" 
| Best Styling 
| 
| 
|-
| 2016
| "Hand in the Fire" (feat. Mr. Oizo)
| Best Animation 
| 
| 
|-
| rowspan=2|2017
| rowspan="2" | "Boys"
| Best Pop Video - UK 
| 
| rowspan=2|
|-
| Vevo Must See Award 
| 
|-
! scope="row"| Varietys Hitmakers Awards
| 2020
| Herself
| Innovator of the Year
| 
| style="text-align:center;" |
|-
! scope="row"|WDM Radio Awards
| 2018
| "Dirty Sexy Money" 
|Best Trending Track
|
| 
|-
! scope="row" rowspan=2|World Music Awards
| rowspan=2|2014
| rowspan=2|"Fancy" 
| World's Best Song
| 
| rowspan=2|
|-
| World's Best Video
| 
|-
! scope="row" |YouTube Music Awards
| 2015
| Herself
| 50 Artists to Watch
|
| 
|-
!scope="row"|Žebřík Music Awards
| 2014
| Herself
| Best International Discovery
| 
|

References

External links 
 

Awards and nominations
Charli XCX
Charli XCX